An undisputed championship is a professional wrestling term for a champion who has obtained all of the major individual championships in his field during his era. The undisputed championship is an extremely rare and prestigious accomplishment.

The first undisputed champions 
The reported first undisputed champion was George Hackenschmidt, who won a series of tournaments in Europe, including a world championship tournament to win the title.  Amongst the other tournaments he won were the annual major tournaments in Paris, France; Hamburg, Germany; St. Petersburg, Russia; and Berlin, Germany. Hackenschmidt also defeated European Greco-Roman Champion Tom Cannon on September 4, 1902, in Liverpool, England to become the first undisputed World Heavyweight Champion.

The only other reigning champion with claim to the belt at the time was Tom Jenkins the American Heavyweight Championship, which unified the American Greco-Roman Championship with the American Catch-As-Catch Can Championship. Jenkins was eventually defeated by Frank Gotch, who took over as the only man with a potentially legitimate claim to being "the true champion".

Hackenschmidt and Gotch finally met in the ring on April 3, 1908, in Chicago, Illinois. Gotch defeated Hackenschmidt to win the World Heavyweight Championship, then abandoned the American Heavyweight Championship in a process similar to today's championship unification. Gotch wrestled for several years before retiring as undisputed champion

Other wrestlers who were recognized as the only major World Champion following Gotch's retirement were Earl Caddock, Joe Stecher, Ed "Strangler" Lewis, Stanislaus Zbyszko, and Wayne Munn. The championship became disputed in the late 1920s, and remained that way for over 20 years, when several major World Heavyweight Championships split from the primary title (namely, Boston's American Wrestling Association World Heavyweight Championship, the National Boxing Association (later, National Wrestling Association) World Championship of Wrestling, and the New York State Athletic Commission World Heavyweight Championship). Other governing bodies would create their own version of the World Championship in the 1930s and 1940s, as well.

Lou Thesz and the National Wrestling Alliance 
After Gotch's retirement, several other men proceeded to hold the then World Heavyweight Championship, including periods of time where the National Wrestling Association formed a second World Heavyweight Championship to contend with the formerly undisputed belt. From that point onward, there was no undisputed champion, as multiple men laid claim to the title without ever backing it up by defeating multiple other contenders.

This all changed in July 1948, when the National Wrestling Alliance (NWA) was formed by multiple promotions and awarded the NWA World Heavyweight Championship to Orville Brown. After Brown suffered career-ending injuries in an automobile accident on November 1, 1949, the NWA recognised Lou Thesz as the champion. Thesz had earlier won the National Wrestling Association's World Heavyweight Championship on July 10, 1948, from Wild Bill Longson.

Thesz traveled to many areas and defeated various champions. He defeated the American Wrestling Association (a Boston-based federation different from Verne Gagne's more famous organization of the same name) World Heavyweight Champion Gorgeous George on July 27, 1950, in a non-title match, and, finally, Baron Michele Leon on May 21, 1952, for the Los Angeles Olympic Auditorium World Heavyweight Championship.

In light of having unified three of the major world heavyweight championships of his time (as well as numerous other lesser-prestige titles) and defeating the reigning AWA World Heavyweight Champion in a non-title match (a major title that was abandoned soon after), Thesz became the Undisputed Champion for some time. From that point onward, the National Wrestling Alliance World Heavyweight Championship (the championship belt that Thesz opted to keep as the designation of all the championships he had won) became the undisputed world heavyweight title for all contenders to seek.

This, however, would change over the years and decades to come as professional wrestling grew and evolved. The American Wrestling Association, owned by Verne Gagne split off from the NWA and declared their primary singles title a world title in 1960. The World Wide Wrestling Federation, owned by Vince McMahon, Sr. followed suit in 1963 and declared their major singles title a world championship. Many other NWA affiliated promotions would split from the NWA over the years with Ted Turner's World Championship Wrestling in 1993, and Tod Gordon's Eastern Championship Wrestling in 1994. Each of these promotions declared their primary singles championship to be a world championship.

World Wrestling Federation/Entertainment 

When the AWA folded in 1991 with Larry Zbyszko as their final champion, one of the last major world titles was gone. Meanwhile, the NWA became less prevalent during the Monday night television ratings war that engrossed the WWF and WCW during the 1990s. ECW shut down in 2001 with Rhino as their last champion, seemingly leaving the group of prominent world championships down to two, and with WCW's subsequent fall and purchase by the WWF during the same year, the World Wrestling Federation Championship remained.

WWF took full advantage of their situation, unifying the unbranded "World Championship" (formerly the WCW World Heavyweight Championship) and WWF Championship at Vengeance in 2001, with Chris Jericho becoming the first Undisputed WWF Champion (and the first undisputed champion in over 50 years in professional wrestling in general). The championship was then represented by the belts of its two predecessors until a singular belt design was commissioned. By May 2002, the WWF had been renamed to World Wrestling Entertainment and the Undisputed WWE Championship, as it was now called, became the top championship of the promotion.

With the purchase of WCW during the previous year, WWE's roster had doubled in size and with newly obtained properties and a desire to further expand, the promotion was essentially divided in what became known as the WWE Brand Extension. This resulted in WWE's two main programs, Raw and SmackDown, becoming distinct brands, acting as complementing promotions under WWE. The WWE Undisputed Championship was then consequently shared between both brands and soon conflict began brewing over the title. In late August 2002, after becoming the youngest WWE world champion at the time by winning the  WWE Undisputed Championship, Brock Lesnar and his title were made exclusive to SmackDown. To remedy this, the Big Gold Belt was brought back the following month to represent the new World Heavyweight Championship and became Raw's top championship, thus making the WWE Championship no longer undisputed.

In 2001 the WWF Cruiserweight Championship that was once property of WCW was undisputed until the 2002 WWE Brand Extension were the title became property of WWE SmackDown were the WWF World Tag Team Championships became property of WWE RAW making this belt no longer undisputed as well and to balance everything out WWE invented a new set of WWE Tag Team Championships for the SmackDown roster and in 2003 Stephanie McMahon also reinstated the WWE United States Championship that was property of WCW strictly for the SmackDown roster.

In 1984 the WWE Women's Championship was always undisputed, until sometime when it was held by Trish Stratus during her third reign the title no longer became undisputed, but it became permanently apart of the WWE RAW roster on September 26, 2002 on SmackDown when General Manager Stephanie McMahon announced that the title will be permanently apart of the RAW roster.

In 2009 the WWE Tag Team Championships became undisputed alongside the WWE World Tag Team Championships once more eversince the WWE brand extension first started back in 2002 after Primo and Carlito unified them at WrestleMania 25 of 2009.

In 2010 the WWE Divas Championship became undisputed after Michelle McCool defeated Melina in the first ever WWE female championship Unification Match in history at Night of Champions of 2010, making the title property of both Raw and SmackDown.

In 2011, the WWE Championship was temporarily referred to as "undisputed" again. After a storyline in which John Cena and CM Punk both claimed the WWE Championship, the two faced off at the 2011 Summerslam, resulting in a single title holder. This was not, however, the same as the undisputed title that existed between 2001 and 2002, as the World Heavyweight Championship was unaffected.

Immediately following Summerslam 2011, the brand extension officially ended, meaning that both the WWE Champion and the World Heavyweight Champion could appear on both Raw and SmackDown. In November 2013, then World Heavyweight Champion John Cena made a challenge to then WWE Champion Randy Orton to determine an undisputed world champion; the match would take place at the TLC: Tables, Ladders & Chairs pay-per-view the following month. Randy Orton defeated John Cena in a TLC match and unified the titles. Subsequently, the World Heavyweight Championship was retired and the WWE Championship was renamed the WWE World Heavyweight Championship and retained its lineage. Like the WWE Undisputed Championship, the WWE World Heavyweight Championship was represented by the belts of its two predecessors until a singular belt design was commissioned in August 2014.

In June 2016, the WWE World Heavyweight Championship reverted to being called the WWE Championship before WWE reintroduced the brand extension the following month. The WWE Champion was drafted to SmackDown and it was renamed the WWE World Championship though reverted to WWE Championship in December 2016. In response, Raw created their own world championship, the WWE Universal Championship.

At WrestleMania 38 in 2022, the Universal Championship held by Roman Reigns from SmackDown and the WWE Championship held by Brock Lesnar from Raw were unified. The winner of the match, Roman Reigns, was then referred to as the Undisputed WWE Universal Champion.

On SmackDown May 20, 2022 the WWE Raw Tag Team Championships and the WWE SmackDown Tag Team Championships were unified when Jimmy and Jey Uso defeated Team RK-Bro Randy Orton & Riddle in a tag team title unification match to determine who would become the Undisputed WWE Tag Team Champions.

Impact Wrestling
In early 2020, Impact Wrestling started a storyline where Moose dubbed himself "Mr. TNA," claiming to represent the company's history while battling former stars—Impact Wrestling was formerly called Total Nonstop Action Wrestling (TNA) from 2002 to 2017. During the second part of Rebellion (taped April 8–10 and aired on April 28), Moose defeated Hernandez and Michael Elgin in a triple threat match which was originally scheduled to be for the Impact World Championship, but reigning champion Tessa Blanchard missed the tapings due to the COVID-19 pandemic. Following the match, Moose brought back the championship belt that represented the then-TNA World Heavyweight Championship from 2011 to 2017 and declared himself the TNA World Heavyweight Champion. While Impact did not officially recognize Moose as champion, Moose defended his self-appointed title several times. The following year on the February 23, 2021, episode of Impact!, the promotion's Executive Vice President Scott D'Amore announced that Moose's self-proclaimed championship was officially sanctioned with Moose immediately recognized as TNA World Heavyweight Champion. A championship unification match was then scheduled for Sacrifice on March 13, 2021, in which Impact World Champion Rich Swann would face TNA World Heavyweight Champion Moose to determine Impact's undisputed world champion. At the event, Swann defeated Moose, deactivating the TNA World Heavyweight Championship while the Impact World Championship became briefly known as the Impact Unified World Championship before reverting to Impact World Championship. The unified championship is represented by both belts.

Titles disputed again 
In 2002, two current major promotions started business; Total Nonstop Action Wrestling (TNA) and Ring of Honor (ROH). TNA took the quick route to success, gaining usage of the NWA titles through a working agreement with the National Wrestling Alliance (NWA). With the NWA World Heavyweight Championship back in the spotlight, TNA presented the title defenses on an international scale. TNA eventually left the NWA in 2007 and thus replaced the NWA World Heavyweight Championship with their own TNA World Heavyweight Championship. TNA was later renamed to Impact Wrestling in 2017. Meanwhile, Ring of Honor established their ROH World Championship, defending the title internationally over several continents by 2003. Another major promotion, All Elite Wrestling (AEW), started up in 2019, which quickly became the United States' second largest promotion behind WWE; their AEW World Championship was introduced later that year.

Additionally, following ECW's original closure in 2001, WWE had purchased its assets and remaining properties. In 2006, WWE re-established the Extreme Championship Wrestling franchise as a third brand to complement the existing Raw and SmackDown brands while the ECW World Heavyweight Championship was recommissioned for the new ECW brand. The brand and the title remained active within WWE until 2010.

At this moment, there is only one undisputed world heavyweight title, the Undisputed WWE Universal Championship.

See also 
 Championship unification
 List of early world heavyweight champions in professional wrestling

References

External links 
 The Wrestling Information Archive
 TitleHistories.com
 Pro-Wrestling Title Histories

Professional wrestling championships
Professional wrestling slang